Anthony David Cocker (born 26 April 1959) was the chief executive of E.ON UK, one of the Big Six UK energy providers. He is also a chairman of Infinis Energy Management Limited's board.

Early life
He was born in the Borough of Fylde, Lancashire. He has a younger brother.

He read mathematics at Lincoln College, Oxford, gaining a BA in 1981 and D.Phil. in 1984. His doctorate researched the shape of water droplets. He later studied at International Institute for Management Development (IMD) in Lausanne in 1988.

Career
He worked for L.E.K. Consulting from 1984 to 1992, then Bass Brewery.

Powergen
He joined Powergen in 1997 as head of corporate strategy. In August 2001 he became managing director of Energy Trading, replacing Nick Horler. Powergen was acquired by E.ON in 2002.

E.ON
In 2008 he became at chief executive of E.ON Energy Trading in Düsseldorf. It was announced in September 2011 that he would become chief executive of E.ON UK, taking that role in January 2012.

In 2015, he earned £908,000.

Infinis
Tony was appointed chairman and non-executive director on 1 August 2017, having retired from E.ON in July 2017.

SSE 
In April 2018, Cocker joined SSE plc. as a non-executive director.

Personal life
He is married with a son (born in November 2000) and daughter (born in August 1998). He married Madeleine Parker in September 1991 in Oxford. He lives in Warwickshire.

See also
 Johannes Teyssen, chief executive of E.ON since May 2010
 Paul Coffey, chief executive of npower since August 2015
 Vincent de Rivaz, chief executive since 2003 of EDF Energy
 Ed Wallis, former chief executive of Powergen
 :Category:Electric power companies of the United Kingdom

References

External links
 E.ON UK

1959 births
Alumni of Lincoln College, Oxford
British chief executives in the energy industry
E.ON
People from the Borough of Fylde
People from Warwickshire
Living people